Theodor Kober (born 13 February 1865 in Stuttgart; died 20 December 1930 in Friedrichshafen) was a twentieth-century German aviation engineer who contributed to the building of the first Zeppelin.

Life 
As an engineer Kober had worked for a balloon manufacturer and in the 1890s Count Ferdinand von Zeppelin enlisted him to produce designs for his airship concept. After several years he and Zeppelin produced the design for the Zeppelin LZ1. Later, in 1912 he founded the Flugzeugbau Friedrichshafen GmbH with financial support from Zeppelin to build over 40% of the Imperial German Navy seaplanes during World War I.

His daughter Ilse Essers was a German engineer who established essential foundations in the field of aeronautical engineering.

References 

1865 births
1930 deaths
Members of the Early Birds of Aviation
Airship designers
German aerospace engineers
German airship aviators
Engineers from Stuttgart
People from the Kingdom of Württemberg